Carmelo Gómez Celada (born 2 January 1962) is a Spanish actor. He is the recipient of two Goya Awards, for best supporting actor in The Method and best leading actor in Running Out of Time. A very popular actor in 1990s Spanish cinema, working under the likes of Julio Medem, Pilar Miró and Imanol Uribe, he is a recurring co-star of Emma Suárez.

Biography 
Carmelo Gómez Celada was born on 2 January 1962 in Sahagún, province of León, and worked the land there as a farmer together with his father until moving to Salamanca, where he joined theatre groups. He graduated from the Madrid's RESAD. He made his feature film debut with a minor role in Voyage to Nowhere (1986), followed by another small role in Bajarse al moro (1988).

In 2013, at the Gijón International Film Festival, he received the Nacho Martinez award.

Filmography

Film

Television 

La Regenta (Fernando Méndez Leite, 1996).

Stage 
La cena (2004–2005).
Elling (2012).

References

Bibliography

External links 

1962 births
Living people
People from the Province of León
Spanish male film actors
Best Actor Goya Award winners
Best Supporting Actor Goya Award winners
20th-century Spanish male actors
21st-century Spanish male actors